Wilson Rodríguez (born 1966-02-04 in Santiago, Dominican Republic) is a retired professional boxer, best known for his 1996 fight with Arturo Gatti (a runner up for Ring Magazine's  1996 Fight of the Year) and his reign as IBF Inter-Continental super featherweight titleholder, which he successfully defended 6 times.

His career record was 48 wins, 10 losses, 3 draws.  A very good fighter, just outside the top tier for that division at the time, he nonetheless had numerous high-profile title fights with John John Molina, Arturo Gatti (whom he dropped before losing to), and Angel Manfredy.

References

1966 births
Living people
Dominican Republic male boxers
Super-featherweight boxers